is a professional Japanese baseball player. He plays pitcher for the Tokyo Yakult Swallows.

External links

 NPB.com

1989 births
Living people
Baseball people from Hyōgo Prefecture
Japanese baseball players
Nippon Professional Baseball pitchers
Tokyo Yakult Swallows players